Little Linga is a small island in the Shetland Islands. It is near West Linga and Vidlin on Mainland, Shetland. It measures  from north to south.

Little Linga is an important colony for the Atlantic grey seal, with approximately 500 pups being born on the island each autumn. In addition the island has a breeding population of around 80 pairs of cormorants on raised nests of seaweed and 200 pairs of fulmars.

Surrounding islands include the Calf of Little Linga, Score Holm, and Beilla Skerry.

On 21 June 2016 it was acquired by the Scottish Wildlife Trust.

See also

 List of islands of Scotland

References

 Shetlopedia

Uninhabited islands of Shetland